Hidroconstrucţia  is a large Romanian construction company specialised in the construction of dams and hydropower stations. The company has constructed hydro power stations in Romania, Algeria, Germany and Iran with a total of 6,411 MW.

During its fifty years of existence the company constructed:
172 dams out of which 144 made of concrete with heights up to 168 m;
176 HPP with an installed power of up to 1050 MW/HPP
837 km. water headraces, having diameters of up to 7.50 m;
189 km. deviation canals and tailraces for the HPP;
495 million cu.m. of excavations in alluvia;
80.8 million cu.m. of excavations in rock;
474 million cu.m. of ballast fillings;
44 million cu.m. of rockfill;
40.9 million cu.m. of concrete above – and underground;
27.4 million sq.m. of drywalls for dikes;
5.7 million sq.m. of tightening walls;
539 km. of drillings and groutings;
355 km. motorways, national roads and other road rehabilitation;
212 km. country roads;
123 bridges totaling 6,320 m in length;
854 km. pipelines for water supply and sewerage;
283,000 sq.m. civil and industrial constructions.

References

External links
Official website 

Construction and civil engineering companies of Romania
Construction and civil engineering companies established in 1950
Privately held companies of Romania
1950 establishments in Romania
Companies based in Bucharest